Attilio Cantoni (2 May 1931 – 22 August 2017) was an Italian rower. He competed at the 1956 Summer Olympics in Melbourne with the men's coxless four where they came fourth.

References

1931 births
2017 deaths
Italian male rowers
Olympic rowers of Italy
Rowers at the 1956 Summer Olympics
Sportspeople from the Province of Lecco
European Rowing Championships medalists
People from Mandello del Lario
20th-century Italian people